Portobello railway station was a station built on the Grand Junction Railway in 1837. It served the Portobello area of Willenhall, and was located near to the level crossing on Noose Lane

The station closed in 1873 due to being unprofitable.  The lines through the station are in use today as part of the Walsall to Wolverhampton Line.

There have been recent proposals to examine reopening of the station, along with Willenhall Bilston Street.

References

Disused railway stations in Wolverhampton
Railway stations in Great Britain opened in 1837
Railway stations in Great Britain closed in 1873
Former London and North Western Railway stations